William Frank Cotty (August 9, 1946 – July 23, 2016) was an American lawyer and politician.

Born in Buffalo, New York, Cotty graduated from Erskine College in 1969 and then received his law degree from University of South Carolina School of Law in 1974. He served in the South Carolina Army National Guard. He lived in Columbia, South Carolina and practiced law. He served on the board of trustees of the Richland School District and was the chairman of the board. Cotty served in the South Carolina House of Representatives from 1995 to 2007 and was a Republican.

Cotty died from lung cancer at his home in Columbia, South Carolina.

References

1946 births
2016 deaths
Politicians from Buffalo, New York
Politicians from Columbia, South Carolina
Erskine College alumni
University of South Carolina School of Law alumni
South Carolina lawyers
School board members in South Carolina
Republican Party members of the South Carolina House of Representatives
Lawyers from Columbia, South Carolina
Lawyers from Buffalo, New York
20th-century American lawyers